Assinia alluaudi is a species of beetle in the family Cerambycidae. It was described by Lameere in 1893.

References

Apomecynini
Beetles described in 1893